Yolett Alessia McPhee-McCuin (born April 30, 1982) is a Bahamian-American basketball coach who is the current head coach of the Ole Miss Rebels women's basketball team. Her team at Jacksonville University won the 2016 ASUN Conference Tournament and advanced to the NCAA Tournament.

Early life and education
Yolett Alessia McPhee was born April 30, 1982 in Freeport, Bahamas. Her parents both worked at Grand Bahama Catholic High School in Freeport: Her father Gladstone "Moon" McPhee was head boys' basketball coach, and her mother Daisy McPhee was school principal. 

McPhee-McCuin graduated from Grand Bahama Catholic in 2000. Although she initially signed with Florida Atlantic University out of high school, she instead attended Miami-Dade Community College from 2000 to 2002, playing at point guard on the women's basketball team. In the 2001–02 season, McPhee-McCuin earned all-state honors and averaged 9.0 points and 6.9 assists, ranking third nationally in assists per game. She graduated from Miami-Dade with a 4.0 GPA in 2002.

From 2002 to 2004, McPhee-McCuin attended the University of Rhode Island and played at point guard for the Rhode Island Rams. She averaged 3.2 points, 1.1 rebounds, and 1.8 assists. In her senior season of 2003–04, McPhee played in 29 games with 15 starts, averaging 2.7 points, 0.9 rebounds, and 2.0 assists. She graduated from Rhode Island in 2004 with a B.A. in business management.

Coaching career

Early coaching career (2004–2013)
McPhee-McCuin began her basketball coaching career as an assistant at Frank Phillips College, a junior college in Borger, Texas, in the 2004–05 season. Her first NCAA Division I coaching job was at Arkansas–Pine Bluff, as an assistant coach from 2005 to 2007.

After one year as assistant coach at the University of Portland in 2007–08, McPhee-McCuin was an assistant coach at Pittsburgh from 2008 to 2010 under Agnus Berenato. The 2008–09 Pittsburgh Panthers finished the season 25–8 and appeared in the Sweet 16 round of the NCAA Tournament.

From 2010 to 2013, McPhee-McCuin was an assistant coach at Clemson under Itoro Umoh-Coleman.

Jacksonville (2013–2018)
McPhee-McCuin's first head coaching job was at Jacksonville University from 2013 to 2018. Inheriting a team with four straight losing seasons, McPhee-McCuin delivered a winning season by her third year in 2015–16, with a 22–11 record and NCAA Tournament appearance. The next two seasons, Jacksonville appeared in the 2017 and 2018 WNIT. In five seasons, McPhee-McCuin had a cumulative 94–63 record at Jacksonville.

Ole Miss (2018–present)
After firing Matt Insell in March 2018, the University of Mississippi hired McPhee-McCuin as head Ole Miss Rebels women's basketball coach on April 4, 2018. This hire followed a 12–19 season in 2017–18, including only one win in Southeastern Conference games.

Ole Miss had just 16 wins in McPhee-McCuin's first two seasons. But after a much improved 2020–21 season that had Ole Miss with a no. 42 NCAA Evaluation Tool ranking, Ole Miss extended McPhee-McCuin through the 2024–25 season on March 10, 2021. Ole Miss finished the season 15–12 and runners-up in the 2021 Women's National Invitation Tournament.

In 2021–22, Ole Miss improved even further with a 23–9 record and an NCAA Tournament appearance, the first such appearance since 2007.

Personal life
McPhee-McCuin is married to Kelly McCuin. They have two children.

Head coaching record

References

External links
Ole Miss Rebels Coaching bio

1982 births
Living people
Bahamian expatriate basketball people in the United States
Bahamian women's basketball players
Clemson Tigers women's basketball coaches
Jacksonville Dolphins women's basketball coaches
Junior college women's basketball coaches in the United States
Junior college women's basketball players in the United States
Miami Dade College alumni
Ole Miss Rebels women's basketball coaches
People from Freeport, Bahamas
Pittsburgh Panthers women's basketball coaches
Point guards
Portland Pilots women's basketball coaches
Rhode Island Rams women's basketball players
Bahamian emigrants to the United States